Wambaix is a railway station located in the commune of Wambaix in the Nord department, France.  The station is served by TER Hauts-de-France trains (Douai - Saint-Quentin).

See also
List of SNCF stations in Hauts-de-France

References

Railway stations in Nord (French department)
Railway stations in France opened in 1891